The Victoria County Station was a proposed nuclear power plant, in Victoria County, 13.3 miles south of Victoria, Texas. The plant, consisting of two 1535 MWe General-Electric-Hitachi economic simplified boiling water reactors was applied for by the Exelon Nuclear Texas Holdings, LLC on September 2, 2008. The project was canceled in August 2012.

Exelon filed a Combined Construction and Operating License (COL) application for the plant on September 3, 2008 with the Nuclear Regulatory Commission. In July 2009, Exelon announced that it was suspending its COL application. In March 2010, Exelon announced that it was formally withdrawing its COL application, while submitting its application for an early site permit (ESP).

On August 28, 2012, Exelon announced that it had notified the Nuclear Regulatory Commission that it was withdrawing its ESP application, which brought to an end all project activity.

See also

Nuclear Power 2010 Program

References

Buildings and structures in Victoria County, Texas
Nuclear power stations using advanced boiling water reactors
Cancelled nuclear power stations in the United States
Nuclear power plants in Texas
Exelon